Jonathan David Mellor is a theatre director and film actor. He has appeared in numerous films, including [REC]² and The Wine of Summer, both in Spain and the U.S.

Career

Mellor starred in the short film Voice Over, directed by Martin Rosete, which was nominated for Best Fictional Short Film at 27th Goya Awards. He starred also in the Drama Horror film Don't Look There. The lead role required acting in three different scenarios that expressed a single emotional state. 
Mellor starred in the movie [REC]2 in 2009.

Selected filmography

 [REC]² (2009) … Dr. Owen
 The Story of David Leonard Sutton (2010) ... Leonard Sutton
 Voice Over (2011) … Lead
 In Between ( 2012)- Dr. William Dyler, also writer.
 very one dies at the end (2013) … Alan Moore
 The Wine of Summer (2013) … Henry
 Melita (2017) ... Narrator
 Tango One (2018) ... Doyle
 Knight and Day (2010)... Barman

References

External links

Living people
1968 births
Male actors from Liverpool
Spanish male film actors